Downtown Auburn Historic District is a national historic district located at Auburn, DeKalb County, Indiana.  The district encompasses 52 contributing buildings in the central business district of Auburn. The district developed between about 1870 and 1935, and includes notable examples of Victorian, Classical Revival, Romanesque Revival, and Colonial Revival style architecture.  Notable buildings include the DeKalb County Courthouse (1911-1914), Henry Opera House (1917), DeKalb County Jail (1918), Commercial Club (1917), Auburn City Hall (1913), South Interurban Station (c. 1910), Dilgard Building (c. 1920–1930), Y.M.C.A. Building (193-1914), Auburn Hotel (1922), U.S. Post Office (1934), and Masonic Temple (c. 1922).

It was added to the National Register of Historic Places in 1986.

References

External links

Historic districts on the National Register of Historic Places in Indiana
Victorian architecture in Indiana
Neoclassical architecture in Indiana
Romanesque Revival architecture in Indiana
Colonial Revival architecture in Indiana
Historic districts in DeKalb County, Indiana
National Register of Historic Places in DeKalb County, Indiana